The Michael B. Fleming Gymnasium is a 2,320-seat multi-purpose arena in Greensboro, North Carolina, United States.  It is located in the Health and Human Performance Building, a $16.2 million facility that opened on the University of North Carolina at Greensboro's campus in June 1989. Its street address is 1000 Spring Garden Street, Greensboro, North Carolina.

It is home to the University of North Carolina at Greensboro Spartans wrestling and volleyball teams.  It also hosts the women's basketball team.  It was formerly the full-time home of the men's basketball team as well, but beginning in the 2009–10 basketball season, they moved to larger Greensboro Coliseum for most of their games. The men's basketball team plays a few games every season at Fleming Gymnasium when the Coliseum is being used for other large events. 

Prior to the 2006–2007 season, Fleming Gym underwent a facelift to improve seating amenities. The new seating includes chairback seating on the lower half with bleacher bench seating in the upper half.  Also as part of the renovation, the team locker rooms and meeting areas for film breakdown and other activities were expanded.

History
The gymnasium, which has seating for more than 1,800 for basketball and 1,200 for volleyball and wrestling, was named for Fleming, a Greensboro civic leader and one of the most ardent supporters of UNCG athletics, on December 1, 1994. Spartan teams first occupied the gym during the 1989–90 academic year.

The largest crowd to see an athletic contest in the gym was 2,302 for a men's basketball game against Charleston Southern on February 25, 1995. The Spartans won, 98–70.

Fleming Gymnasium has played host to various conference championship tournaments, including Big South volleyball in 1994 and 1995, Big South women's basketball in 1994, Southern Conference (SoCon) women's basketball in 1998 and 1999, SoCon wrestling in 1999 and SoCon volleyball in 2001 and 2008. In 2005, it played host to the SoCon / ACC Wrestling Championships, also known as MatJam.

Prior to the 1996–97 season, the National Basketball Association's Boston Celtics held their preseason training camp in the gym.

See also
 List of NCAA Division I basketball arenas

References

Basketball venues in North Carolina
College basketball venues in the United States
College volleyball venues in the United States
UNC Greensboro Spartans basketball venues
Sports venues in Greensboro, North Carolina
Buildings and structures completed in 1989
Sports venues completed in 1989
1989 establishments in North Carolina